Magdalena Kučerová (born 6 October 1976) is a former German tennis player of Czech descent.

Kučerová, who won one singles title and eight doubles tournaments on the ITF Women's Circuit in her career, reached a doubles ranking high of world No. 157 in March 2002.

ITF finals

Singles (1–2)

Doubles (8–4)

References

External links
 
 

1976 births
Living people
Tennis players from Prague
German female tennis players
German people of Czech descent
Czech expatriate sportspeople in Germany